The 1986 Maryland Terrapins football team represented the University of Maryland in the 1986 NCAA Division I-A football season. In their fifth and final season under head coach Bobby Ross, the Terrapins compiled a 5–5–1 record, finished in fifth place in the Atlantic Coast Conference, and outscored their opponents 262 to 211. The team's statistical leaders included Dan Henning with 2,725 passing yards, Alvin Blount with 505 rushing yards, and James Milling with 650 receiving yards.

Schedule

References

Maryland
Maryland Terrapins football seasons
Maryland Terrapins football